is a passenger railway station in the city of Kiryū, Gunma, Japan, operated by the private railway operator Jōmō Electric Railway Company.

Lines

Station layout
Nishi-Kiryū Station has one island platform serving two dead-headed tracks. The station is attended.

Platforms

Adjacent stations

History
Nishi-Kiryū Station was opened on November 10, 1928. The station platform received protection as a Registered Tangible Cultural Property in 2005. and the station building itself also received the same status the same year.

Passenger statistics
In fiscal 2019, the station was used by an average of 1633 passengers daily (boarding passengers only).

Surrounding area
 Kiryū City Hall
Kiryū Post Office

See also
 List of railway stations in Japan

References

External links

  
	

Stations of Jōmō Electric Railway
Railway stations in Gunma Prefecture
Railway stations in Japan opened in 1928
Kiryū, Gunma
Registered Tangible Cultural Properties